The Eternal Love (Chinese: 双世宠妃) is a 2017 Chinese television series based on the novel Bao Xiao Chong Fei: Ye Wo Deng Ni Xiu Qi (Chinese: 爆笑宠妃：爷我等你休妻) by Fan Que. The series stars Liang Jie and Xing Zhaolin, and aired on Tencent Video from July 10 to August 15, 2017. The second season aired on Tencent Video from October 22 to December 3, 2018. The third season aired on Tencent Video from June 1 to June 14, 2021.

The low budget drama was an unexpected hit when it aired in China.

Synopsis
An unforeseen event changes the life of Qu Tan'er (Liang Jie), after a suicide attempt over her love for Mo Yihuai (Wang Ruichang). She wakes up to find that another person has entered her body named Qu Xiaotan, who has time-traveled from the modern world. Both girls share a different personality, with Qu Tan'er being gentle and submissive while Qu Xiaotan is wild and uninhibited; whenever one of them tells a lie, the other takes over their shared body. Duty forces Qu Tan'er to marry Mo Liancheng (Xing Zhaolin), thus beginning an unexpected romance between two people thrown together by circumstance: in fact, as Tan'er persists in her love for Yihuai, Liancheng falls in love with modern girl Xiaotan.

Cast

Main

Supporting

Qu family

Dongyue Kingdom Royal Family

Others

Soundtrack

Production
Pre-production of the series began in November 2016. The production team from Tencent Penguin Pictures selected the novel due to several trending elements, such as "sweet and touching" romance and fantasy.

Shooting commenced in Hengdian World Studios on February 2, 2017 and wrapped up on March 27, 2017.

In November 2017, a second season was announced via Tencent Media Conference, with the original leads returning. It began filming in Guizhou on March 17, 2018 and wrapped up on May 14, 2018.

Shooting for season 3 commenced in Hengdian World Studios on June 7, 2020.

Awards and nominations

References

Chinese romantic comedy television series
Chinese time travel television series
2017 Chinese television series debuts
Television shows based on Chinese novels
Chinese web series
Tencent original programming
Television series by Tencent Penguin Pictures
2017 web series debuts